Gridnev (masculine) or Gridneva (feminine) is a Russian surname. Notable people with the surname include:

Aleksei Gridnev (born 1977), Russian footballer
Daniil Gridnev (born 1986), Russian footballer
Valeriy Gridnev (born 1956), Russian portrait painter 

Russian-language surnames